Justice Bao is a Chinese TV series starring producer Jin Chao-chun as the Song dynasty official Bao Zheng. The series ran for 3 seasons from 2010 to 2012. In addition to Jin, Kenny Ho, Fan Hung-hsuan and Lung Lung again reprise their iconic roles from the 1993 Taiwanese hit Justice Pao and the 2008 Chinese series Justice Bao.

Seasons

Cast and characters

 Note: Some cast members played multiple roles.

Main and recurring characters

Other characters (in order of appearance)

 Season 1 (2010)
 Jin Weifu as Bao Xing
 Wei Hua as Huli jing
 Li Guangfu as Zhang Biegu
 Zhang Wei as Lin Feng
 Xu Ming as Jiang Wan
 Guo Yiming as Pang Yu
 Zhang Jian as Xiang Fu
 Dong Weimin as Tian Zhong
 Ji Hai as Pang Shun
 Zhan Shibao as Pang An
 Benny Chan as Bai Yutang
 Miao Qing as Han Zhang
 Zhang Peng as Jiang Ping
 Wang Wenyan as Lu Fang
 Li Yonglin as Xu Qing
 Lin Yuezhang as Chen Lin
 Xie Yuanzhen as Suo'er
 Zhang Beibei as Hong Yujiao
 Zhou Zihan as Tian Rong
 Zhang Jiayi as Tian Rong's mother
 Li Peng as Wu Wen
 Zhong Yuping as Huaniang
 Zhang Liyong as Qu Ping
 Gao Jia as Gu Jun
 Wang Zhengquan as Fan Tong
 Chi Tao as Liu Yang
 Li Bing as Tie Jun
 Wang Jianjun as Xing Liang
 Wang Xiaobin as Peng Li
 Song Aiwu as Madame Wind
 Tan Jianchang as Chu Ge
 Wang Wenyan as Yuanhao
 Zhang Jian as Li Zhong
 He Zixiang as Qiu Xiong
 Liu Hongkun as Yu Changzhi
 Zhang Yan as Tu Qiang
 Jiang Chengpeng as Ding Qiang
 Li Jinming as Yuanchang
 Wang Wei as Zhu Ye
 Gu Changfu as Huo Gang
 Zhang Yuanrong as He Xin
 Chen Wei as Wei Dong
 Ren Xiaohan as Xiaocui
 Deng Ming as Wu Ming
 Gao Liang as Nangong Yuhui
 Zhang Xin as Ding Zhaolan
 Xu Ge as Ding Zhaohui
 Xu Ming as Chen Sheng
 Bi Haifeng as Tie Rong
 Fan Zhiling as Huniu
 Yao Hongming as Xiao Feng
 Xu Lin as Diao San
 Tian Luhan as Zhu'er
 Guo Zi as Tang Fei
 Wang Ke as Feng Hao
 Xu Zuming as Yao Wei
 Sun Qiang as Guo Liang
 Yan Xuejin as Ye Fang
 Chiang Hung-en as Ouyang Chun
 Liu Lei as Delin
 Cui Bo as Yuanzhen
 Mi Kaili as Leisha
 Xiang Yu as Fang Lie
 Liu Tao as Yang Mu
 Mao Linying as Wutong
 Gao Zhan as Nangong Quan
 Wang Huichun as Zhao Yi
 Jin Ming as Ding Yuehua
 He Zhonghua as Nangong Yuyao
 Liu Fangyu as Zhu Ying
 Xu Nannan as Yun'er
 Wang Yumei as Bao Mian's mother
 Liu Peiqi as Bao Mian
 Season 2 (2011)
 He Zhonghua as Zhao Xiang
 Xu Nannan as Consort He
 Zhang Shen as Di Qing
 Cui Bo as Huiniang
 Wang Ke as Du Bin
 Xiang Yu as Du Ping
 Cai Die as Di Ting
 Bai En as Ling Yun
 Xie Yuanzhen as Yinxin
 Tian Luhan as Xique
 Zhang Yan as Luo Qiong
 Wang Xiaobin as Yu Meng
 Jin Yuquan as Xu Gu
 Deng Ming as Hong Chang
 Fan Zhiling as Yezi
 Liang Jinhua as Guizong
 Zhan Shibao as Ding Gui
 Wang Yao as Peng Qi
 Dong Weimin as Yuan Zhong
 Xu Ming as Zhou Yan
 Zhang Jian as Xiao Shi
 Liu Dian as Guo Xuan
 Fu Weifeng as Wen Qi
 Wang Wenyan as Xiao Wen
 Liu Weidong as Lu Di
 Zhou Chengqiang as Ba Shan
 Li Yonglin as Ba Hai
 Na Jiawei as Ji Lei
 Li Peng as Miao Jun
 Bi Yuanjin as Liu You
 Wang Wenhu as Tie Dan
 Zhan Shibao as Shi Bao
 Zhang Liyong as Ding Ren
 Shen Jian as Gu Feng
 Guo Zi as Guo Tao
 Li Jinming as Shi Hong
 Chi Tao as Zhu Quan
 Season 3 (2012)
 Wang Qianyou as Luo Bei
 Cui Bo as Qi Ying
 She Nannan as Consort Dowager Zheng
 Yue Yueli as Murong Songlin
 Xie Yuanzhen as Baolin
 Huang Juan as Song Qiao'er
 He Zhonghua as Deng Ning
 Wang Yichan as Yu Ping
 Li Guangfu as Shi Jian
 Gao Liang as Gou Rong
 Liu Tao as Zheng Ning
 Xu Xiyan as Murong Ziyun
 Xu Ge as Feng Qi
 Bai En as Shangguan Wujiu
 Lin Jinfeng as Lei Ming
 Mao Yiwen as Lin Chuan
 Wang Zhengquan as Xu San
 Wang Ke as Prince Kang
 Li Xinran as Zhao Xiang
 Zhang Jian as Lang Yun
 Lou Yajiang as Bi Peng
 Zhu Minming as Deng Qiu
 Wang Renjun as Shi Yu
 Wang Wenyan as Zhou Dong
 Liu Dian as Guo Xuan
 Yao Zhuangfei as Liu Xu
 Huang Jing as Yu'er
 Wang Xiaobin as Gu Li
 Deng Ming as Zhu Quan
 Li Enqian as Shi Shi
 Chi Tao as Feng Wen
 Huang Gang as Shangguan Jing
 Gong Fangmin as Hong Tong
 Mei Xiaozheng as Sun Yuan
 Zhang Mengmeng as Ding Xiang
 Zhou Bin as Zhu Tong
 Wang Yong as Shi Dong
 Chen Xiuliang as Jiao Hai
 Zhan Shibao as Liu Quan
 Zhou Chengqiang as Hu Nan
 Tang Tingting as Yuxian
 Pan Yu as Zhang Hong
 Xu Li as Xu Qiang
 Lü Yang as ZHu Li
 Tian Siping as Lin Huan
 Ye Xinyu as Song Bing
 Xue Jingrui as Shan Xiong
 Li Yifeng as Su Feng
 Jia Kangxi as Su Yan
 Sun Hanwen as Doupi
 Zhang Liyong as Yu Ping
 Li Yonglin as Tie Niu
 Dong Qi as Xiu'er
 Zhang Yan as Wang Quan
 Wang Wenhu as Xiaosi
 Liu Weidong as Balin
 Zhang Lili as Cuifeng
 Chen Muyi as Huasheng
 Li Xinlu as Xiaobao
 Min Guohui as Yang Li
 Wang Xingyuan as Fake Shi Yu

Theme songs

References

Fictional depictions of Bao Zheng in television
2010 Chinese television series debuts
Television shows based on The Seven Heroes and Five Gallants
Gong'an television series
Television shows set in Kaifeng